Andrew Godfrey Carter (born November 9, 1968) is an American former professional baseball pitcher, who played in Major League Baseball (MLB) for the Philadelphia Phillies in  and .

In 24 career games, Carter had a 0–2 record with a 4.75 (ERA). He threw and batted left-handed.

Carter was drafted by the Phillies in the 37th round (952nd overall) of the 1987 amateur draft.

References

External links

1968 births
Living people
Philadelphia Phillies players
Baseball players from Philadelphia
Allentown Ambassadors players
American expatriate baseball players in Taiwan
Clearwater Phillies players
Phoenix Firebirds players
Reading Phillies players
Scranton/Wilkes-Barre Red Barons players
Spartanburg Phillies players
Uni-President Lions players
Utica Blue Sox players